BoxSets is an Australian pay television channel, screening boxsets of hit drama and comedy programming. The channel launched on Foxtel on 3 November 2014.

History
On 4 September 2014, Foxtel announced that on 3 November 2014 they would launch a new channel (BoxSets) which would feature boxsets of successful and popular TV series. The channel would be available as both a linear channel and a video on demand service (available through internet-connected Foxtel set top boxes and through Foxtel's streaming app Foxtel Go). The news comes as Foxtel has increased competition from IPTV services (namely Netflix) and the increasing prevalence of binge-watching among viewers.

Later that month it was announced Joanna Lumley had been signed to produce advertisements for BoxSets. The ad design is the same as the one used by sister company Sky (UK and Ireland) for their On Demand service which has a similar premise as BoxSets.

Following the success of BoxSets, Foxtel launched a second whole seasons channel Binge in October 2016. BoxSets will be moved to channel 115 with Binge launching on channel 116.

Programming
Note: Programming availability may vary between the linear channel and video on demand service. 
Absolutely Fabulous (seasons 1-5)
Angels in America
Band of Brothers
Big Love (seasons 1-5)
Boardwalk Empire (seasons 1-5)
Devil's Playground
Entourage (seasons 1-5)
Game of Thrones (seasons 1-4)
Getting On
Girls (season 1-3)
Looking (season 1)
Luck (season 1)
Morden (season 1)
The Newsroom (seasons 1-2)
The Pacific
Rome (seasons 1-2)
The Sopranos (seasons 1-6)
True Blood (seasons 1-7)
Wentworth (seasons 1-2)

References

Television networks in Australia
English-language television stations in Australia
Television channels and stations established in 2014
2014 establishments in Australia
Foxtel
Commercial-free television networks in Australia